The Journal of Risk Research is a peer-reviewed academic journal covering all aspects of risk analysis, communication, judgment, and decision-making. It was established in 1998 and is published by Routledge. The editor-in-chief is Ragnar Löfstedt (King's College London). The Managing Editor is Jamie Wardman (University of Nottingham). It is the official journal of the European and Japanese sections of the Society for Risk Analysis.

Abstracting and indexing 
The journal is abstracted and indexed in:

According to the Journal Citation Reports, the journal has a 2016 impact factor of 1.34.

References

External links 
 

Taylor & Francis academic journals
Business and management journals
Publications established in 1998
English-language journals
Monthly journals